The Atrevida class was a class of six corvettes built for the Spanish Navy in the 1950s.

Design and construction
In 1945, the Spanish State drew up a large construction programme to re-equip the Spanish Navy, which had many old and worn out ships, as shipbuilding had ground to a near halt during the Spanish Civil War and the Second World War. The programme included 18 destroyers, six corvettes, six submarines together with motor-torpedo boats and patrol vessels.

Displacement was  standard and  full load.

As designed, the ships had a gun armament of one 105 mm (4.1 in) dual-purpose gun, backed up by a close-in anti-aircraft armament of two 37 mm guns (in one twin mount) and twelve 20 mm anti-aircraft guns (in three quadruple mounts). Four depth-charge throwers were fitted, and 20 mines could be carried. The ship had a crew of 132.

Construction of the first two ships of the class,  and  began at Bazán's (now Navantia) Cartagena shipyard in 1950, but economic problems slowed construction, and the remaining ships were not laid down until 1953. The first two ships were completed in 1954–1955, but US Mutual Defense Assistance Programme funding allowed the remaining four ships to be completed with modernised armament and sensors more suitable for anti-submarine warfare. The 105 mm gun was replaced by a single US 3-inch (76 mm) Mark 26 semi-automatic anti-aircraft gun, with short range anti-aircraft armament consisting of three 40mm Bofors L/70 guns. Anti-submarine armament consisted of two Hedgehog anti-submarine mortars, supplemented by eight depth charge mortars and two depth charge racks. Sensors consisted of SPS-5B surface search radar and QHBa sonar. Displacement increased to  standard and  full load. The four ships still under construction completed in 1959–1960, with Atrevida converting to the revised standard in 1960.

Service
Their sonar and anti-submarine armament was removed and they were redesignated as Patrullero de Altura (PA). They patrolled in the Atlantic between Gibraltar and the Canary Islands until replaced by s from 1991. The last of the class, Atrevida, was stricken in 1992.

Ships

Notes

References

Sources

External links
Descubierta F-50/F-60 (in Spanish)

Corvettes of the Spanish Navy
Corvette classes